Buckleria girardi is a moth of the family Pterophoridae that is known from Guinea.

References

Oxyptilini
Moths described in 1992
Insects of West Africa
Moths of Africa